The 1989 1. divisjon was the 45th completed season of top division football in Norway. The season began on 30 April 1989, and ended on 8 October 1989.

22 games were played with 3 points given for wins and 1 for draws. Number eleven and twelve were relegated. The winners of the two groups of the 2. divisjon were promoted, as well as the winner of a series of play-off matches between the two second placed teams in the two groups of the 2. divisjon and number ten in the 1. divisjon.

This was the last season the top flight of Norwegian football would be called the 1. divisjon. The following year, the league changed its name to Tippeligaen, from its sponsor, Norsk Tipping.

Teams and locations
''Note: Table lists in alphabetical order.

League table

Results

Relegation play-offs
Vålerengen, Djerv 1919, and HamKam competed in the play-offs, Vålerengen won and remained in the top division.
Results
Match 1: HamKam 2–2 Vålerengen
Match 2: Djerv 1919 2–0 HamKam
Match 3: Vålerengen 1–0 Djerv 1919

Table

Season statistics

Top scorers

Attendances

References
League table
Fixtures
Goalscorers

Eliteserien seasons
Norway
Norway
1